Étienne-Émile Baulieu (born 12 December 1926) is a French biochemist and endocrinologist who is best known for his research in the field of steroid hormones and their role in reproduction and aging.

Biography
Baulieu was born Émile Blum to Jewish parents in Strasbourg, France. His father, who died when he was four was Léon Blum, a physician, and an early specialist in diabetes. Baulieu changed his name during World War II when his family fled to the area near Grenoble and he engaged in the French resistance. After the war he attended the Faculté de Médecine de Paris and became a doctor of medicine in 1955. He studied further under his mentor Max Fernand Jayle in the field of steroid hormones and obtained his PhD degree in 1963 at the Lycée Pasteur, Faculté de Médecine and Faculté des Sciences in Paris.

In 1963 Baulieu was named director of INSERM, and in 1970 he became a Professor of Biochemistry at the Faculty of Medicine of Bicêtre, affiliated with University of Paris-South. Since 2004 Baulieu is a member of the French "Ethical Advisory Committee" (Comité consultatif national d'éthique) for science and health. He is also associated with the "Institute of Longevity and Aging" [L'Institut de la longévité, des vieillesses et du vieillissement]. In 2008, he started the Institut Baulieu to foster research into healthy longevity.

Research
Baulieu has had an ongoing interest in dehydroepiandrosterone (DHEA). In 1960 he demonstrated that DHEA was the main adrenal androgen, was largely conjugated as a hydrophilic sulfate, and described its metabolism and functions. He worked to uncover the production of estrogens by the placenta during pregnancy and this led to the concept of DHEA being a "prohormone". Upon the invitation of Seymour Lieberman Baulieu became visiting scientist at the Columbia University in 1961–1962, and during this time he met Gregory Pincus, the father of the "birth control pill". Baulieu then turned to more studies in contraception and in the regulation of fertility and pregnancy. He became a pioneer in the description of intracellular sex steroid receptors and identified major intracellular participants such as the heat shock proteins. He worked on the progesterone receptor and androgen receptor. While steroid receptors are generally found within the cell, Baulieu identified a membrane receptor for a steroid hormone in Xenopus laevis.

Neurosteroids
Baulieu discovered that DHEA and pregnenolone are produced in the brain and introduced the term "neurosteroids" in 1981. These steroids are active in the nervous system, help repair myelin, protect the nervous system, and enhance memory. Such agents may prove to be useful in the maintenance of brain function during age, and Baulieu suggests that use of DHEA in the elderly may ameliorate certain age-associated deficits including memory loss and depressive mood. Baulieu conducts clinical research about the potential benefits of DHEA in the elderly population.

RU486
Baulieu is worldwide known for his work on RU486 (Mifepristone) and has been termed the "Father" of the abortion pill. Baulieu who had identified the progesterone receptor suggested to Roussel-Uclaf to modify the progesterone molecule to create an anti-progesterone. Georges Teutsch then synthesized an agent that became initially known as RU468 in 1980. Baulieu investigated the actions of this agent as an anti-progesterone steroid that proved to be able to induce early abortion and became more effective in conjunction with misoprostol. As a proponent of a nonsurgical approach to abortion Baulieu became an advocat RU468 even when the company withdrew from the product and propelled him into the limelight of the abortion debate. As an anti-progesterone RU468 also has other potential such as in the treatment of certain conditions (breast cancer, brain cancer, endometriosis, diabetes, hypertension), and the anti-cortison activity he discovered may be useful to manage depression or Cushing's syndrome.

Longevity
Baulieu has taken increasingly more interest in what he has called the "longevity revolution", that people are living longer, and its implications. As part of this, he is investigating the potential of hormonal substitution such as DHEA to increase well-being in old age. The "Institute Baulieu" was started in 2008 to address issues that are detrimental to health in older people. One focus of research in the 2020 decade is finding ways to decrease the problems of the elderly as to functioning independently.

Honours and awards
 1967 Chevalier of the Ordre national du Mérite
 1982 French Academy of Sciences, President, 2003–4
 1989 Albert Lasker Award for Clinical Medical Research,
 1990 National Academy of Sciences
 1990 Grand Officier of the Légion d'honneur
 1990 Golden Plate Award of the American Academy of Achievement
 2002 French Academy of Medicine,
 European Academy of Sciences and Arts

Bibliography
Baulieu EE, Kelly PA. Hormones — From Molecules to Disease. Springer (1990) 
Baulieu EE. Neurosteroids: A New Regulatory Function in the Nervous System. Humana Press (1999) 
Baulieu EE. Abortion Pill. Simon & Schuster (1991) 
Baulieu EE. Etienne-Émile Baulieu. Génération Pilule (Paris: 1990).(Autobiography in French)

References

External links
An interview with Étienne-Émile Baulieu about his research (French)
Étienne-Émile Baulieu: fragments de vie et de recherche A portrait of Étienne-Émile Baulieu by BioTV (French)
Lecture on Aging and Hormones

1926 births
Living people
French endocrinologists
French biochemists
French Resistance members
20th-century French Jews
21st-century French Jews
Academic staff of the Collège de France
Grand Officiers of the Légion d'honneur
Officers of the French Academy of Sciences
Lycée Pasteur (Neuilly-sur-Seine) alumni
Foreign associates of the National Academy of Sciences
Members of the European Academy of Sciences and Arts
Recipients of the Lasker-DeBakey Clinical Medical Research Award